The 2018–19 Northern Kentucky Norse women's basketball team will represent Northern Kentucky University in the 2018–19 NCAA Division I women's basketball season. The Norse, led by third year head coach Camryn Whitaker, play their home games at BB&T Arena and were members of the Horizon League. They finished the season 11–18, 9–7 in Horizon League play to finish in a tie for fifth place. They lost in the first round of the Horizon League women's tournament to IUPUI.

Roster

Schedule

|-
!colspan=9 style=| Exhibition

|-
!colspan=9 style=| Non-conference regular season

|-
!colspan=9 style=| Horizon League regular season

|-
!colspan=9 style= | Horizon League Women's Tournament

See also
 2018–19 Northern Kentucky Norse men's basketball team

References

Northern Kentucky Norse women's basketball seasons
Northern Kentucky
Northern Kentucky
Northern Kentucky